Roelof Oosthuizen (1894 –1947) was a cricketer who played one match of first-class cricket for Border in 1913.

While aged 19 and a boarder at Selborne College in East London, he made his first-class debut for Border, alongside another Selbornian, Lawrence Miles, against the touring MCC in November 1913. He top-scored in Border's second innings with a hard-hitting 23. The MCC players rated him as one of the best young players in South Africa and presented him with an MCC cap.

However, he never played major cricket again. After he left school he returned to the family sheep farm in the Karoo. He fought with South African forces in the South West Africa campaign in World War I.

He died of heart failure at the farm in 1947, leaving a widow, Elizabeth, and a son, Ochert.

References

External links

1894 births
1947 deaths
South African cricketers
Border cricketers
Alumni of Selborne College